A Drop In The Ocean is an Australian children's television series which first screened on the ABC in 1972. A sequel drama called Birds of Passage was made.

Plot
A Drop In The Ocean follows the story of three children who became involved with smugglers. It was filmed around the wharves and slipways of Balmain on Sydney Harbour.

Production
The series was produced by the ABC's "Young People's Department". The episodes were also edited together as a film to screen overseas. Most of the dialogue for the film is improvised. Director Barry Sloane told the Sun Herald: "It gives enormous advantages when working with child actors, and leads to a more natural film."

Cast
 Kate Fitzpatrick as Shirl (a crook)
 Don Barkham as Dingo (Shirl's male accomplice)
 Matthew Crosby (son of actor Don Crosby.)
 Michelle Booker
 Carlos Merlo

See also
 List of Australian television series

References

External links
A Drop In The Ocean at Classic TV Australia

Australian Broadcasting Corporation original programming
Australian science fiction television series
Australian children's television series
1972 Australian television series debuts
1972 Australian television series endings